Mankapur is a constituency of the Uttar Pradesh Legislative Assembly covering the city of Mankapur in the Gonda district of Uttar Pradesh, India.

Mankapur is one of five assembly constituencies in the Gonda Lok Sabha constituency Since 2008, this assembly constituency is numbered 300 amongst 403 constituencies.

Election results

2022

2017
Bharatiya Janta Party candidate Ramapati Shastri won in last Assembly election of 2017 Uttar Pradesh Legislative Elections defeating Bahujan Samaj Party candidate Ramesh Chandra by a margin of 60,161 votes.

References

External links
 

Assembly constituencies of Uttar Pradesh
Gonda district